Hardcore (also known as hardcore techno or hardcore house) is a genre of electronic dance music that originated in the United Kingdom, the Netherlands, Belgium and Germany in the early 1990s. It is distinguished by faster tempos and a distorted sawtooth kick (160 to 200 BPM or more), the intensity of the kicks and the synthesized bass (in some subgenres), the rhythm and the atmosphere of the themes (sometimes violent), the usage of saturation and experimentation close to that of industrial dance music. It would spawn subgenres such as gabber.

History

1950s to early 1960s 
Hardcore is rooted in the 1950s and early 1960s Musique concrète. This music was created using sound synthesis and computer-based digital signal processing added to natural sounds or classical music such as the new trend in Hard-core with Sefa (piano), Dr. Peacock (Oboe...), Timmy Trumpet or Mariana Bo (violin). This movement mainly originated in France with Pierre Schaeffer, Pierre Henry, Pierre Boulez, or Olivier Messiaen. It evolved, more precisely, in the sub hard-core branch Frenchcore.

Early 1970s to early 1980s 
Hardcore is also linked to the 1970s and early 1980s industrial music, specifically the elements of hard electronic dance music. Groups such as Throbbing Gristle, Coil, Cabaret Voltaire, SPK, Foetus and Einstürzende Neubauten produced music using a wide range of electronic instruments. The message diffused by industrial was then very provocative. Some of the musical sounds and experimentation of industrial have directly influenced hardcore since the beginning of the movement.

1980s 
In the mid-1980s, under the influence of the Belgian group Front 242, electronic body music (EBM), a new genre more accessible and more dancing inspired by industrial and new wave, appeared. This style is characterized by minimalism, cold sounds unlike disco, funk or house, with powerful beats, generally combined with aggressive vocals and an aesthetic close to industrial or punk music. Under the influence of new beat, another Belgian genre and acid house, EBM music became harder. All the elements were present for the arrival of hardcore. The beginnings of the genre, they are traced at the very end of the 1980s in Belgium, within the new beat scene with the titles : Rock To The Beat by 101 released in 1988, Saigon Nightmare by 101 released in 1988, Warbeat by Bassline Boys released in 1989, I Want You! by The Concrete Beat released in 1989, I Love You by The Acid Kids released in 1988, Doughnut Dollies by  released in 1988, Action In Paradise by Export released in 1988, Acid New-Beat by Tribe 22 released in 1988, I Sit On Acid by Lords Of Acid released in 1988, Acid Rock by Rhythm Device released in 1989, Double B by Dirty Harry released in 1989, Also Sprach Zarathustra by Bingo! released in 1989, Europe by Christine D released in 1989, Do That Dance by The Project released in 1990, in 1988 the Belgian new beat arrived in Frankfurt in West Germany.

The term hardcore is not new in the music world. It was first used to designate a more radical movement within punk rock (Black Flag, Minor Threat, Bad Brains...) which, in addition to hardening the music, also attached importance to their attitude and their way of life as in the street where it was born: violent, underground, but engaged and sincere. The term has then been reused when hip hop emerged in the late 1980s, designating the harder part of the hip hop, with the same characteristics: a harder sound, engaged lyrics and a whole way of life dedicated to the respect of the values shown by rappers like KRS-One or Public Enemy. The term hardcore techno has first been used by EBM groups like , Pankow, and Leæther Strip in the late 1980s, although their music had nothing to do with hardcore. 's Sucking Energy (Hard Core Mix), released in 1985, was the first track ever to use the term hardcore, within an EDM context.

1990s 
In 1990, German producer Marc Trauner (also known as Mescalinum United) claimed to have released the first hardcore techno track with "We Have Arrived".  The British group Together released its track "Hardcore Uproar", also in 1990.  Music journalist Simon Reynolds has written books on hardcore techno, covering bands related to the Belgium hardcore scene like Second Phase and T99 or Dutch hardcore bands such as L.A. Style and Human Resource. Many of the iconic "stabs" that would become part of hardcore were popularized by these and other Belgian techno producers during the early 1990s, like the "Mentasm" and the "Anastasia" stabs.

In the early 1990s, the terms "hardcore" and "darkcore" were also used to designate some primitive forms of breakbeat and drum and bass which were very popular in England and from which have emerged several famous producers like the Prodigy, Altern-8 and Goldie. It introduced sped up hip-hop breakbeats, piano breaks, dub and low frequency basslines and cartoon-like noises, which has been retrospectively called 'old skool' hardcore (a.k.a. breakbeat hardcore) and is widely regarded as the progenitor of happy hardcore (which later lost the breakbeats) and jungle (which alternatively lost the techno style keyboard stabs and piano breaks).

An important event in the popularization of the genre occurred with the release of the 1990 track "We Have Arrived" by the German producer Mescalinum United, of Frankfurt. Trauner founded the label Planet Core Productions in 1989 and has produced more than 500 tracks, including 300 by himself until 1996. Another important name of the hardcore scene was PCP: Miroslav Pajic, better known as Miro. His group PCP popularized a slow, heavy, minimal and very dark form of hardcore that is now designated as "darkcore" or "doomcore".

In the United States, the New York pioneer of techno Lenny Dee launched the first dedicated hardcore record label Industrial Strength Records in 1991 that has federated a large part of the American scene, making New York one of the biggest centers of early American hardcore. Other American producers on the label included Deadly Buda and the Horrorist, but the label has also produced producers from other nationalities. At the same time in Rotterdam, the DJs and producers Paul Elstak and Rob Fabrie popularized a speedier style, with saturated bass-lines, quickly known as "gabber", and its more commercial and accessible form, happy hardcore.

Paul Elstak founded Rotterdam Records in 1992, which became the first hardcore label in the Netherlands. In 1992 at Utrecht, a large rave called The Final Exam led to the creation of the label ID&T. Launched in 1993, the concept of Thunderdome quickly popularized hardcore music in Europe with a catalogue of CD compilations and events, attracting thousands of young people that launched the gabber movement. Just during the single year of 1993, four compilations were released with increasing success. Many artists on the compilations have become well-known figures in the scene, notably 3 Steps Ahead, DJ Buzz Fuzz, The Dreamteam, Neophyte, Omar Santana, and Charly Lownoise and Mental Theo in the gabber/happy hardcore registry. The same year, the label Mokum Records was created by Freddy B who had success with artists and groups like Technohead Tellurian, the Speedfreak, Scott Brown, and the Belgian musician Liza N'Eliaz, pioneer of speedcore.

Around 1993, the style became clearly defined and was simply named "hardcore", as it left its influences from Detroit techno.

In England, the members of the sound system Spiral Tribe, including Stormcore, 69db, Crystal Distortion and Curley hardened their acid-breakbeat sound, becoming the pioneers of the "acidcore" and "hardtechno" genres. In 1994, they founded the label Network 23 which among others has produced Somatic Responses, Caustic Visions and Unit Moebius, establishing the musical and visual basis of the free party rave.

In France, the pioneers of hardcore include Laurent Hô. The french hardcore scene later went on to develop into frenchcore.

In the late 1990s, hardcore progressively changed as gabber waned in popularity. This left a place for other hardcore-influenced styles like mákina and hardstyle.

2000s 
Under the influence of Hardstyle and industrial hardcore, a new scene was developing featuring DJ Promo and his label The Third Movement. This scene now known as mainstream hardcore emerged in the early 2000s with a modern, mature, slower, and sophisticated form. It was successful in Europe, especially in Netherlands and Italy, with producers and groups like Endymion, Kasparov, Art of Fighters, The Stunned Guys and DJ Mad Dog. Happy hardcore continues its movement underground and has evolved bringing out other related genres such as eurobeat, UK hardcore, Freeform hardcore and Full-on Hardcore.

Labels such as Enzyme Records, Crossbones and Bloc 46 have produced darkcore artists, like Ruffneck, Fifth Era and The Outside Agency.

As the free party movement was successful in all the Europe, freetekno appeared. Numerous producers and labels emerged representing  the hard techno and the frenchcore genres: Epileptik, Audiogenic, Les Enfants Sages, Tekita, Breakteam, Mackitek, B2K and Narkotek.

Meanwhile, in 2001, Norwegian DJ duo Thomas S. Nilsen Fiction and Steffen Ojala Søderholm began to develop the nightcore genre influenced by pitch-shifted vocals in German group Scooter's songs "Nessaja" and "Ramp! (The Logical Song)". Nightcore artists started appearing on services such as LimeWire in mid-2003, and YouTube in 2006.

2010s 

The early 2010s saw the rise of hardcore internationally, with artists such as Angerfist gaining popularity quickly. The hardcore scene thrived during this period with many new producers and labels making their mark on the scene, both in Europe and the rest of the world, appearing even at North America's biggest music festival, Electric Daisy Carnival. In 2011, Angerfist entered the DJ Mag Top 100 at position #39.

The middle of the decade saw a shift in popularity, from mainstream hardcore to faster styles such as frenchcore, uptempo hardcore and terrorcore. Although these styles existed previously already, an increase in artists and events around 2015 helped these styles develop and move to the forefront of the audience's attention. The shift from the older range of 160–180 beats per minute to 200+ changed the hardcore market, creating a demand for more energetic and intense hardcore than before. Artists like Sefa & Dr. Peacock saw a quick rise within the scene and influenced the musical direction to a louder, faster, but more melodic and euphoric style. Major artists from other genres such as Marshmello, Carnage, Porter Robinson  and Headhunterz started to occasionally play faster hardcore in their sets.

The end of the decade saw rapid growth of the hardcore scene in Europe. Hardcore festivals within the Netherlands saw a significant rise in attendance. 2019's edition of Thunderdome reached an attendance of almost 40,000 people and became the biggest hardcore event to ever take place. Regular large scale events hardcore started happening outside of the Netherlands in countries like Spain, Russia, Austria, Switzerland and the Czech Republic among other European countries.  In America hardcore remains a relatively underground genre, but can be found in major cities being pushed by independent promoters and artists.

Hard dance

Hard dance is an umbrella category of electronic dance music genres characterized by fast tempos and hard kick drums, but less harsh-sounding and often a bit slower than hardcore. The category includes hard house, hard trance, hardstyle, some forms of Eurodance and regional genres, such as mákina, lento violento and others. Sometimes the category has crossovers with hardcore genres such as frenchcore or UK hardcore. Despite this, the category is sometimes referred to as synonymous with hardcore techno music generally.

Notable related events 
Defqon.1 Festival
Masters of Hardcore
Sensation Black
Thunderdome
Dominator Festival 
 Darkside (UK)

See also

 Hakken
 Hardstyle
 List of electronic music genres

References 

 
Electronic dance music genres